Caracollina lenticula is a species of gastropods belonging to the family Trissexodontidae.

The species is found in Mediterranean.

References

Trissexodontidae
Gastropods described in 1831